Randall Lee Feenstra (born January 14, 1969) is an American politician and businessman serving as the U.S. representative for Iowa's 4th congressional district. The district covers the western border of the state, including Sioux City and Council Bluffs, but stretches as far east as Story County, Franklin County, and Marshall County, including Ames.

A member of the Republican Party, Feenstra served as an Iowa state senator for the 2nd district from 2009 to 2021. He was the Sioux County treasurer from 2006 to 2008.

Feenstra defeated incumbent Steve King in the primary election for the Republican nomination for Iowa's 4th congressional district in 2020. He defeated Democratic nominee J. D. Scholten in the general election by almost 25 points and was sworn into Congress on January 3, 2021.

Early life and education
Randy Feenstra was born to parents Lee and Eleanor Feenstra on January 14, 1969. He is of Dutch ancestry. Feenstra graduated from Western Christian High School, where he played basketball. He received a bachelor's degree in business communications from Dordt University, then called Dordt College, and his MPA from Iowa State University.

Career 
Feenstra began his career as sales manager for the Foreign Candy Company, known for being the first US company to import Warheads, later serving as city administrator of Hull, Iowa for seven years. In 2006, he was elected Sioux County Treasurer, replacing Robert Hagey. Randy Jacobsma replaced Feenstra in a 2008 special election, as Feenstra won his first term in the Iowa Senate that year.

Feenstra was elected to the Iowa State Senate in 2008 with 24,595 votes, running unopposed. He was reelected in 2012, again without opposition. He ran for a third uncontested term in 2016. In the Iowa Senate, Feenstra served on the Capital Projects, Fiscal, Tax Expenditure, Transportation, Ways and Means, and State Government Committee.

While serving in the Iowa Senate, Feenstra worked for ISB Insurance in Hull, operated by Iowa State Bank. In 2017, he joined the faculty of Dordt University, after having taught there in an adjunct capacity since 2011.

U.S. House of Representatives

Elections

2020 

In 2019, Feenstra announced he would challenge incumbent Republican U.S. Representative Steve King in the 2020 Republican primary in Iowa's 4th congressional district. His state senate district includes much of the northwestern portion of the congressional district. King, a nine-term incumbent, has a record of making inflammatory remarks, including support of the term "white nationalist." He had been stripped of his committee seats for asking why "white nationalist" was offensive. Feenstra noted this in announcing his campaign, saying that King's "caustic nature" had left the 4th "without a seat at the table."

Republican Party leadership supported Feenstra in the primary. Feenstra raised more money during the primary than King, and was supported by the United States Chamber of Commerce and National Right to Life Committee. Feenstra's candidacy was also supported by conservative political commentator and radio host Ben Shapiro, who donated and urged his Twitter followers to donate to Feenstra's campaign.

Feenstra won the June 2 primary with 45.7% of the vote to King's 36%. Much of Feenstra's margin came from dominating his state senate district, which he carried with almost 75% of the vote. He defeated J. D. Scholten in the general election by a large margin, winning every county in his district except Story County.

2022 

Feenstra ran for reelection in the district for the 2022 elections. He defeated Democrat Ryan Melton and Liberty candidate Bryan Holder by a wide margin.

Tenure

Iraq 
In June 2021, Feenstra was one of 49 House Republicans to vote to repeal the Authorization for Use of Military Force Against Iraq Resolution of 2002.

Committee assignments 
 Committee on Agriculture
 Committee on Budget
 Committee on Science, Space, and Technology

Caucus memberships 

 Republican Main Street Partnership
Republican Study Committee

Personal life
Feenstra married his wife Lynette in 1996. They have four children.

References

External links
Representative Randy Feenstra official U.S. House website
 Senator Randy Feenstra official Iowa General Assembly site
 Campaign website
 Senator Randy Feenstra at Iowa Senate Republican Caucus
 
 Financial information (state office) at the National Institute for Money in State Politics
 

|-

|-

1969 births
20th-century American businesspeople
21st-century American businesspeople
21st-century American educators
21st-century American politicians
American businesspeople in insurance
American city managers
American people of Dutch descent
American salespeople
Businesspeople from Iowa
County treasurers in Iowa
Dordt University alumni
Dordt University faculty
Republican Party Iowa state senators
Iowa State University alumni
Living people
People from Hull, Iowa
Republican Party members of the United States House of Representatives from Iowa